Damato is a surname. Notable people with the surname include:

Anthony P. Damato (1922–1944), United States Marine
Antonio Damato (born 1972), Italian football referee